Kamel Kawaya (born 6 June 1998) is a Syrian footballer who currently plays as a midfielder for Al-Manama.

Club career
In 2020, Kawaya transferred to Tishreen.

References

1998 births
Living people
Syrian footballers
Association football midfielders
Al-Shorta Damascus players
Tishreen SC players
Syrian Premier League players